The MAD Symposium is an annual symposium held in Copenhagen, Denmark consisting of presentations from chefs, farmers, academics, thinkers, and artists. The event is hosted by MAD Food Organization, which was founded in 2011 by Danish chef René Redzepi, who is also the founder of the Copenhagen-based restaurant, Noma. The two-day symposium takes place inside a circus tent along the waterfront of Refshaleøen. The audience for MAD consists predominantly of chefs, aspiring cooks, farmers, journalists, and other foodservice professionals. The event has been described as "a mashup of TED, Burning Man, and SXSW" and "The Food World's G-20".

Philosophy 
MAD's mission statement is "to expand knowledge of food to make every meal a better meal; not just at restaurants, but every meal cooked and served. Good cooking and a healthy environment can and should go hand-in-hand, and the quest for a better meal can leave the world a better place than we found it. MAD is committed to producing and sharing this knowledge and to taking promising ideas from theory to practice."

In describing the reasons for MAD's existence, Redzepi has said, "The role of the chef is evolving and developing into a position of influence — one that impacts the manner in which people and food professionals consume and connect with food. Such responsibility requires education, an elevation of awareness, and social maturity. MAD recognizes that the modern chef is faced with challenges and responsibilities that go far beyond supplying simple sustenance for the duration of a single meal. Accordingly, the symposium aims to feature speeches from speakers of different disciplines in order to expose numerous perspectives on food and culture. MAD wants those who attend the symposium to return to their kitchens and communities to reflect on what they have seen and heard. There are new questions we now know to ask, so we can become more inquisitive, imaginative, and knowledgeable." 

At the end of the MAD4 Symposium, René Redzepi stated that MAD's new mission would be to take all the knowledge it had gained and start to act. Since then it has begun work on several major projects including publishing, event hosting, and collaboration with major organizations like the World Bank.

Organization structure 
MAD is a not-for-profit grassroots operation composed of a full-time team and collaborators spread throughout Europe, Australia, and the United States. The full-time team is made up of Melina Shannon-DiPietro (director), Victor Borberg (project coordinator), Bella Napier (program manager), and Mikkel Westergaard (manager of the VILD MAD program).

MAD4 
The fourth MAD Symposium took place on 24 and 25 August 2014 and was co-curated by D.O.M. chef and founder Alex Atala. 
Albert Adria — Chef, Spain
Alex Atala — Chef, Brazil
Anya von Bremzen — Journalist, Russia
Chris Cosentino— Chef, USA
Chris Ying — Journalist, USA
Christine Muhlke — Author, USA
Darina Allen — Chef, Ireland
Eric Schlosser— Journalist, USA
Eyvind Hellstrøm — Chef, Norway
Fulvio Pierangeli — Chef, Italy
Hervé This — Chemist, France
Isabel Soares— Activist, Portugal
Jeremiah Tower — Chef, USA
Julian Baggini — Philosopher, UK
Madhur Jaffrey — Author, UK
Olivier Roellinger — Chef, France
Paola Antonelli — Curator, USA
Paul Freedman — Historian, USA
Pierre Koffmann — Chef, UK/France
Ron Finley — Urban gardener, USA
Silvano Giraldin— Restaurant manager, UK
Tatiana Levha — Chef, France 
Tatsuru Rai— Chef, Japan

MAD3 
The third MAD took place on 25 and 26 August 2013, and was co-curated by Momofuku chef and founder David Chang and the editors of Lucky Peach magazine. The theme of the symposium was "guts."

MAD3 Speakers:

Alex Atala — Chef, Brazil
Vandana Shiva — Environmental Activist, India
Dario Cecchini — Butcher, Italy
Christian Puglisi — Chef, Denmark
Margot Henderson — Chef, United Kingdom
Sandor Katz — Fermentation Revivalist, USA
Jon Reiner — Author, USA
Pascal Barbot — Chef, France
Diana Kennedy — Author, Mexico/UK
Roy Choi — Chef, USA
Cynthia Sandberg & David Kinch — Farmer & Chef, USA
Heribert Watzke — Food Scientist, Switzerland
Martha Payne — Schoolgirl Activist, Scotland
Alain Ducasse — Chef, France
David Choe — Artist, USA
Josh Whiteland — Guide, Australia
Barbara Lynch — Chef, USA
Knud Romer — Author, Denmark
Daniel Klein & Mirra Fine — Activist Filmmakers, United States
Ahmed Jama — Chef, Somalia
Jonathan Gold — Writer, USA
Michael Twitty — Food Historian, USA
Jason Box — Glaciologist, USA/Denmark
Roland Rittman — Forager, Sweden

MAD2 

The second MAD took place on 1 and 2 July 2012. The theme of the symposium was "appetite."

MAD2 Speakers:

Tor Nørretranders — Writer, Denmark
Roderick Sloan — Sea Urchin Diver and Ocean Explorer, Norway
David Chang — Chef, USA
Enrique Olvera — Chef, Mexico
Massimo Bottura — Chef, Italy
Hugh Fearnley-Whittingstall — Activist Chef, UK
Shinichiro Takagi — Chef, Japan
Andrea Pieroni — Ethnobiologist, Italy
Patrick Johansson — Butter Viking, Sweden
Dan Barber — Chef, USA
Chido Govera — Mushroom Farmer, Zimbabwe
Paul Rozin — Psychologist, USA
Anthony Myint & Danny Bowien — Mission Chinese Food, USA
Massimo Montanari — Historian, Italy
Rasmus Kofoed — Chef, Denmark
Nordic Food Lab — Denmark
Andrea Petrini — Writer, Italy
Wylie Dufresne — Chef, USA
Leif Sørensen — Chef, Faroe Islands
Fergus Henderson and Trevor Gulliver — Chef and Restaurateur, UK
Ferran Adrià — Chef, Spain

MAD1 

The inaugural MAD took place on 27 and 28 August 2011. The theme of the symposium was "vegetation."

MAD1 Speakers:

Alex Atala — Chef, Brazil
Tør Norretranders — Writer, Denmark
Miles Irving — Forager, UK
Daniel Patterson — Chef, USA
Yoshihiro Narisawa — Chef, Japan
Hans Herren — Policymaker, Switzerland
Kamal Mouzawak — Community leader, Lebanon
Iñaki Aizpitarte — Chef, France
Thomas Harttung — Businessman, Denmark
Magnus Nilsson — Chef, Sweden
Jacqueline McGlade — Head of the EEA, UK
Ben Shewry — Chef, New Zealand
Stefano Mancuso — Biologist, Italy
François Couplan — Forager, France
Massimo Bottura — Chef, Italy
Søren Wiuff — Farmer, Denmark
Molly Jahn — Policymaker, USA
Michel Bras — Chef, France
Harold McGee — Writer, USA
David Chang — Chef, USA
Andoni Luis Aduriz — Chef, Spain
Gastón Acurio — Chef, Peru

MAD Mondays 

In an effort to stir debate on a local level and include those outsides of the restaurant trade in the MAD community, the organization stages MAD Mondays, a series of panel discussions on food culture.

In March 2014, MAD hosted a New York City edition, its first outside of Copenhagen. The talk was titled "What We Talk About When We Talk About Being a Chef," and took place at the Drawing Center, featuring Peter Meehan as moderator and Mario Batali, Gabrielle Hamilton, Bill Buford, Lee Hanson and Riad Nasr as panelists.

MADFeed 
The MADFeed is an online publication that extends the MAD conversation throughout the year. The platform hosts news and video from MAD events, original articles from the MAD team exploring the past, present, and future of food, and essays and columns from a wide range of voices, including chefs Dan Barber and Margot Henderson, musician James Murphy, and artist Olafur Eliasson.

References

External links 

 

Annual events in Copenhagen
 Recurring events established in 2011
2011 establishments in Denmark